S&M, or sadomasochism, is the enjoyment of inflicting or receiving pain.

S&M may also refer to:

 S&M (album), a 1999 live album by Metallica
 S&M2, a 2020 follow-up live album
 "S&M" (song), a 2010 song by Rihanna
 S&M, a 2001 album by Le Shok
 "S&M", a 1979 song by Thin Lizzy from Black Rose: A Rock Legend
 "S and M", a 1988 song by 2 Live Crew from Move Somethin'
 Sam & Max, a comic series and media franchise
 Serbia and Montenegro

See also
 BDSM, a wider term encompassing both S&M and other forms of activity
 SM (disambiguation)
 M&S (disambiguation)